14 Days to Life is a 1997 German thriller film directed by Roland Suso Richter.

Plot
Young lawyer Konrad von Seidlitz is celebrating his engagement with Cornelia, the daughter of justice minister Friedemann Volkerts. He hasn't paid his parking fines for two years, and as a publicity stunt to boost his career, he insists on being sentenced to jail for two weeks as punishment. While inside, he behaves arrogantly, believing that his knowledge of the system will protect him. He manages to make a few enemies, however, and one day prior to his release, two hundred grams of cocaine are found in his cell during a search. Instead of being released after two weeks as planned, he is sentenced to two years without parole for drug trafficking as a result of a plot by his law firm partner Axel Häring, who is having an affair with Seidlitz's fiancée.

Seidlitz now discovers the harsh reality of everyday prison life. He is humiliated and his reputation destroyed. As he gradually learns how to adapt to his new situation, he befriends another prisoner, Viktor Czernetzky, who helps him uncover the intrigue and restore his reputation. Seidlitz escapes his confinement with the help of the prison doctor, among others, but later returns voluntarily in order to secure the support of his fellow prisoners for the fight against Häring. A showdown takes place in court between the former law firm partners and Häring is sentenced to a five-year prison term. Seidlitz believes he has left the nightmare behind him; however, his connections to the criminal underworld eventually catch up with him. He is forced into a hopeless life and death situation and must save his friend Czernetzky by committing murder.

Cast
 Kai Wiesinger as Konrad von Seidlitz
 Michael Mendl as Viktor Czernetzky
 Katharina Meinecke as Dr. Annika Hofer
 Axel Pape as Axel Häring
  as Cornelia Volkerts
 Jürgen Schornagel - Kaschinski
 Axel Milberg - Roland Kleinschmidt
  as Ramon
 Detlef Bothe as Rudi
  as Schröder
  as Sergeant Major Kaiser
  as Kruse
 Peter Fitz as prison warden
  as Justice Minister Friedemann Volkerts
 Ulrich Bähnk as prosecutor

References

External links
 

1997 thriller films
1990s prison films
German prison films
1990s German films